The 1966 La Flèche Wallonne was the 30th edition of La Flèche Wallonne cycle race and was held on 29 April 1966. The race started in Liège and finished in Marcinelle. The race was won by Michele Dancelli of the Molteni team.

General classification

References

1966 in road cycling
1966
1966 in Belgian sport
1966 Super Prestige Pernod